The Louisiana Historical Association is an organization established in 1889 in Louisiana to collect and preserve the history of Louisiana and its archives.

The organization was formed, in part, for the operation of New Orleans' Memorial Hall, which was donated to them on January 8, 1891.

Their journal, the Louisiana History: The Journal of the Louisiana Historical Association has been published since 1960.

References

External links

Organizations established in 1889
History of Louisiana
Organizations based in New Orleans